Wayara or Wayaro is a town and union council of Uthal Tehsil in Balochistan province, Pakistan. It is located at 26°3'27N 66°30'12E with an altitude of 53 metres (177 feet).

References

Union councils of Lasbela District
Populated places in Lasbela District